Eva Asderaki (born 27 January 1982), also known by her married name Eva Asderaki-Moore, is a Greek tennis umpire, who has umpired international tennis matches since 2001. She has umpired at all four Grand Slam tournaments, and in 2015, she became the first woman to umpire a men's US Open tennis final.

Personal life
Asderaki was born on 27 January 1982 in Chalcis, Greece. As a youngster, she started playing tennis. She was once ranked the seventh best under-16 tennis player in Greece.

Asderaki has lived in England and now lives in Australia with her husband Paul Moore. The couple married in 2012 in London, and they had their first child in July 2018.

Career
Asderaki has a gold umpiring accreditation from the International Tennis Federation. She started as a line judge at her local tennis club in 1997, and she earned her first ITF umpiring badge in Thessaloniki in 2000. From 2000 to 2008, she studied umpiring in Luxembourg. She is the only current international Greek tennis umpire.

Asderaki's first professional event was in Athens in 2000. The event had a prize equivalent to around 10,000€ for the winner. Asderaki started umpiring internationally in 2001, and her first international event was in Israel. Asderaki umpired at the 2004 Summer Olympics in Athens, Greece. In 2007, she started regularly umpiring in WTA tour events.

In 2011, Asderaki umpired in the women's singles events at Wimbledon, and the US Open. During the US Open final, she had a verbal disagreement with Serena Williams, after overturning a point as Williams had shouted during the rally. Williams later said that Asderaki was "ugly on the inside", although Williams later claimed that she had mistaken Asderaki for another umpire that she had disagreed with on a previous occasion.

In 2013, Asderaki umpired the women's singles final at Wimbledon. In 2015, Asderaki became the first woman to umpire a men's US Open tennis final when she umpired the final between Novak Djokovic and Roger Federer. Her umpiring performance was seen as so good that she was more popular than Djokovic and Federer on social media after the final, and Asderaki considers it the highlight of her career. In 2016, she umpired at the Australian Open, her home grand slam, for the first time. She umpired at the 2018 Fed Cup whilst pregnant. She umpired at the 2019 Wimbledon Championships, included the men's singles semi-final between Novak Djokovic and Roberto Bautista Agut. She umpired a 2019 US Open match between Federer and Damir Džumhur during which Džumhur was criticised for shouting at Asderaki. In 2020, Asderaki umpired the Australian Open women's singles final between Sofia Kenin and Garbiñe Muguruza.

In the 2022 Australian Open men's semifinals, Asderaki was called upon when Daniil Medvedev accused Stefanos Tsitsipas of receiving coaching from his father Apostolos in Greek. She was positioned underneath Tsitsipas's coaching box and did catch Apostolos giving coaching, allowing chair umpire Jaume Campistol to issue a coaching violation to Tsitsipas.

References

Living people
Sportspeople from Chalcis
Women tennis umpires
Greek referees and umpires
1982 births
Greek expatriate sportspeople in Australia